Bond v. Floyd, 385 U.S. 116 (1966), was a United States Supreme Court case.

Background 
Julian Bond, an African American, was elected to the Georgia House of Representatives in June 1965. Bond was a member of the Student Nonviolent Coordinating Committee (SNCC), which opposed the Vietnam War.   After his election, during a news interview, Bond endorsed SNCC's views, stating that he did not support the war, and that, as a pacifist, he was opposed to all war. Members of the Georgia House of Representatives objected to Bond's statements, and petitioned to prohibit him from joining the House. A hearing was held, and Bond repeated his pacifist viewpoints, but maintained that he never urged draft-card burning or other law violations. The House committee voted to prohibit Bond from joining the House.

Bond sued in federal court, but the District Court upheld the House, concluding that Bond's remarks exceeded criticism of national policy and that he could not in good faith take an oath to support the State and Federal Constitutions.   Bond appealed to the Supreme Court.

Opinion of the Court 
The Supreme Court, in a unanimous decision, ordered the Georgia House of Representatives to permit Bond to take his seat. The Court held:
 Though a State may impose oath requirements on legislators, it cannot limit their capacity to express views on local or national policy.  
 A majority of state legislators is not authorized to test the sincerity with which another duly elected legislator meets the requirement for holding office of swearing to support the Federal and State Constitutions. 
 The State may not apply to a legislator a First Amendment standard stricter than that applicable to a private citizen.

External links
 
 

1966 in United States case law
American Civil Liberties Union litigation
United States Supreme Court cases
United States Supreme Court cases of the Warren Court